Scopula cleoraria is a moth of the family Geometridae. It was described by Francis Walker in 1861. It is found in India, Bhutan and Afghanistan.

Subspecies
Scopula cleoraria cleoraria (north-western India)
Scopula cleoraria effrenata (Walker 1863) (Bhutan)

References

Moths described in 1861
cleoraria
Moths of Asia
Taxa named by Francis Walker (entomologist)